The 2013 Knoxville NightHawks season was the second and final season for the professional indoor football franchise and their second in the Professional Indoor Football League (PIFL). The NightHawks were one of seven teams that competed in the PIFL for the 2013 season.

The team played their home games under head coach Cosmo DeMatteo at the James White Civic Coliseum in Knoxville, Tennessee. The NightHawks earned a 2–10 record, placing seventh in the league, failing to qualify for the playoffs.

Schedule
Key:

Regular season
All start times are local to home team

Roster

Division standings

References

External links
2013 results

Knoxville NightHawks
Knoxville NightHawks
Knoxville NightHawks